Danpatipur  is a village in Chanditala II community development block of Srirampore subdivision in Hooghly district in the Indian state of West Bengal.

Geography
Chanditala police station serves this village.

Gram panchayat
Villages and census towns in Naiti gram panchayat are: Adan, Bankagachha, Chikrand, Danpatipur and Naiti.

Demographics
As per 2011 Census of India, Danpatipur had a total population of 1,768 of which 866 (49%) were males and 902 (51%) were females. Population below 6 years was 213. The total number of literates in Bankagachha was 1,134 (72.93% of the population over 6 years).

Transport
The nearest railway station is Janai Road railway station on the Howrah-Bardhaman chord line which is a part of the Kolkata Suburban Railway system.

Danpatipur is off NH-19 (old number NH 2) / Durgapur Expressway.

References 

Villages in Chanditala II CD Block